Konsmo is a village in Lyngdal municipality in Agder county, Norway. The village is located south of the lake Ytre Øydnavatnet along the Audna river in the Audnedalen valley. The Konsmo Church is located in the village. The village was also the administrative centre of the old municipality of Konsmo which existed from 1911 until 1964 and then it was the administrative centre of the municipality of Audnedal from 1964 until 2020.

Name
The municipality (originally the parish) is named after the old Konsmo farm (Old Norse: Konungsmór), since the first church was built there. The name is a corruption of Kongsmoen which means King's moor.

References

External links
 Weather information for Konsmo 

Villages in Agder
Lyngdal